Lelant and Carbis Bay was an electoral division of Cornwall in the United Kingdom which returned one member to sit on Cornwall Council between 2009 and 2021. It was abolished at the 2021 local elections, being succeeded by St Ives East, Lelant and Carbis Bay.

Councillors

Extent
The division represented the villages of Carbis Bay, Lelant, Longstone and Trevarrack. The division was nominally abolished during boundary changes at the 2013 election, but this had little effect on the ward. From 2009 to 2013, the division covered 742 hectares in total; after the boundary changes in 2013, it covered 748 hectares.

Election results

2017 election

2013 election

2009 election

References

Electoral divisions of Cornwall Council
Penwith